Nelė Žilinskienė (née Savickytė, born 29 December 1969) is a lithuanian retired female high jumper. Born in Telšiai, her personal best jump, first cleared in Vilnius in July 1994, was 1.96 metres. She again cleared this height when finishing fifth in the 1996 Olympic final.

Achievements

References

1969 births
Living people
Lithuanian female high jumpers
Athletes (track and field) at the 1992 Summer Olympics
Athletes (track and field) at the 1996 Summer Olympics
Athletes (track and field) at the 2000 Summer Olympics
Olympic athletes of Lithuania
European Athletics Championships medalists
Universiade medalists in athletics (track and field)
People from Telšiai
Universiade silver medalists for Lithuania
Medalists at the 1993 Summer Universiade
Competitors at the 1998 Goodwill Games